Luben Bojidarov Pampoulov (born 14 March 1981) is an Austrian former professional tennis player.

Biography
Born in Sofia, Pampoulov left Bulgaria for Austria at the age of 10 and grew up in the city of Dornbirn. He comes from a tennis background, with both his father Bozhidar Pampoulov and uncle Matei being former Bulgarian Davis Cup players.

Pampoulov, a left-handed player, reached a best singles ranking on the professional tour of 392. As a doubles player he made two main draw appearances at the St. Poelten ATP Tour tournament and in 2003 won a Challenger title in his native Sofia.

In 2003 he left the tour to study and play tennis at UCLA. He wasn't able to compete in varsity tennis until 2004 due to eligibility rules, then in 2005 was captain of the NCAA championship winning team.

Pampoulov co-founded Silicon Valley company GSV Asset Management.

Challenger titles

Doubles: (1)

References

External links
 
 

1981 births
Living people
Austrian male tennis players
Sportspeople from Sofia
People from Dornbirn
Bulgarian emigrants to Austria
Sportspeople from Vorarlberg
UCLA Bruins men's tennis players